Pëleya, also spelt as Péléa, is a Wayana village on an island in the Litani River.

Geography 

Notes

References 

Indigenous villages in French Guiana
Maripasoula
Villages in French Guiana